The rufous twistwing (Cnipodectes superrufus) is a species of bird in the family Tyrannidae (tyrant flycatchers). It was described as a new species in 2007.

It is associated with bamboo growing in humid forested regions in south-eastern Peru, northern Bolivia and far western Brazil (Acre only). Most of its range is remote. Nevertheless, it has recently been estimated that the total population is below 10,000 individuals, leading to recommendations of treating it as vulnerable, and this was followed by BirdLife International in 2009. As suggested by its common name, its primaries are modified as in the related, but smaller, brownish twistwing. Unlike the brownish twistwing, the rufous twistwing is bright rufous overall.

In 2009, Andrew Spencer recorded the effect of the twist in the wings of the rufous twistwing. To hear the sound, follow the link at the bottom of this page.

References

 Lane, D., G. P. Servat, T. Valqui H., & F. R. Lambert. 2007. A distinctive new species of Tyrant flycatcher (Passerifomer: Tyrannidae: Cnipodectes) from south-eastern Peru. Auk. 124(3): 762–772.
 Tobias, J. A., D. J. Lebbin, A. Aleixo, M. J. Andersen, E. Guilherme, P. A. Hosner, & N. Seddon. (2008) Distribution, Behaviour and Conservation Status of the Rufous Twistwing Cnipodectes superrufus. The Wilson Journal of Ornithology 120(1): 38–49.
BirdLife Species factsheet

External links
 Photo of the rufous twistwing - arkive.org
 http://www.xeno-canto.org/recording.php?XC=40219

Birds of South America
Birds of Brazil
Birds of Peru
Birds of Bolivia
Birds of the Amazon Basin
Cnipodectes
Birds described in 2007
Taxa named by Daniel F. Lane
Taxa named by Frank R. Lambert